The Miguick River flows in the unincorporated territory of Linton, in the Portneuf Regional County Municipality), in the administrative region the Capitale-Nationale, in the province of Quebec, Canada.

Geography 

In this segment of its course, the water of the river pass through many rapids. Several tributaries increase the volume of the river including the discharge of Miguick Lake.

Near the mouth, there is a hamlet named "Miguick" (same toponym as the river). Via Rail train stop there upon request. An important railway bridge is crossing the Miguick river mouth. In the last kilometers of its course, Miguick river follows a very serpentine path.

Toponymy 

The term is known at least since the arrival of the railway in this sector, around 1888–89. The designation "Miguick" is Aboriginal origin. The term is similar to the words "magwak" or "makwa" which means "bear" in the Algonquin language. The name has changed with the use by the forestry workers, loggers, workers of the railway, missionaries, explorers... The name "Miguick River" was officially registered on December 5, 1968, in the register of the "Commission de toponymie du Québec" (Geographical Names Board of Québec).

History 

Until the arrival of the railroad around 1888–89, the sector of Miguick river was accessible only by boat on Batiscan River, when the ice was gone. From November to April, thanks to the ice, the area became accessible with cars pulled by horses. However, the snow conditions could limit traffic. Well known by indigenous people, the valley of the river attracted hunters, fishermen and trappers. In the second half of the 19th century, logging was granted on the outskirts of the Batiscan River and its tributaries.

The exploitation of this forest in the area has been furthered by the construction of access roads and the arrival of the railroad from 1888 to 1889 to the Mid Batiscanie. This stretch of railroad will reach later Chambord, Lac Saint-Jean. The extraction of architectural stone began around 1888 near the Miguick river in a quarry operated by Mr. Bélanger, a mason of Quebec City. The stone from this quarry was used to build the base including the Jacques Cartier (section Monuments), opened on June 24, 1889, by the Saint-Jean-Baptiste Society. Masons of this quarry also tailored the stones of the wall of the former courthouse in Quebec. The type of stone from this quarry was a pinkish gray farsundite coming from the "Suite Rivière-à-Pierre".

In Miguick sector, recreational and tourist activities have grown intensely priori through private clubs and the implementation of the Portneuf Wildlife Reserve.

See also 

 Municipal Directory - Linton - Unorganized Territory
 Commission de toponymmie du Québec (Geographical Names Board of Québec)
 Municipal Affairs and Regions - Regional maps
 White River (Portneuf), Quebec
 Rivière-à-Pierre
 Portneuf County, Quebec
 List of rivers of Quebec

References 

Rivers of Capitale-Nationale